Glide Path is a novel by the English writer Arthur C. Clarke, published in 1963. Clarke's only non-science fiction novel, it is set during World War II and relates a fictionalized version of the development of the radar-based ground-controlled approach (called "ground-controlled descent" in the novel) aircraft landing system, and includes a character modeled on Luis Alvarez, who developed this system. It is based on Clarke's own wartime service with the Royal Air Force, during which he worked on the GCA project.

References

External links 
 

1963 British novels
1963 science fiction novels
Novels by Arthur C. Clarke
Novels set during World War II
Aviation novels
Harcourt (publisher) books